Sobrance is a town in Košice Region, Slovakia, around  from Uzhhorod, Ukraine, and  east of Michalovce. Located in the Eastern Slovak Lowland not far from the Vihorlat Mountains, it is the easternmost town in Slovakia.

Etymology
The name comes from a Slavic personal name + patronimic suffix -ce, compare with similar Czech name Sebran ("picked up child") and Sebranice. The first written record comes from 1409 (Zobranch). Older literature can mention also incorrect date 1344.

History
In 1910, the town had 1216 inhabitants, 538 Hungarians and 577 Slovaks. Before the First World War the town was part of Austria-Hungary. After the First World War as a result of the Treaty of Trianon the town became part of newly founded Czechoslovakia and became the capital city of its own district. During the Slovak-Hungarian War, Sobrance became part of Hungary. During the Second World War the town was heavily damaged and after the war became part of Czechoslovakia again, but did not immediately regain its district status. Since the Dissolution of Czechoslovakia, Sobrance has been part of Slovakia. It regained its district town status in 1996.

The first reference to Jewish residents appears in the May 15, 1739 Jewish Conscription of Ung County which recorded only one Jewish family. The head of the household was Marko Joseffovics (Marko the son of Josef), a distiller of whisky (palinka, slivovica or vodka). By July 1746 there were two Jewish families—Marko Joseffovics and Hersko Abrahamovics (Hersko the son of Abraham). The Chevra Kadisha or burial society was founded in about 1780, a time when the Jewish population of northeastern Hungary began to grow due to migrations from Galicia. Their percentage stood at 24.3% in 1910. Menashe Simcha Friedman (b.1855- d.1926) was the town Rabbi and was known as the Sobrance Rov. The synagogue, which was still standing in 1929, was built in about 1800. Following the Nazi invasion of Hungary on May 17, 1944,  all of the Jews living in Sobrance were deported to Auschwitz concentration camp as part of the Final Solution where most were murdered upon arrival. The property and belongings that were left behind were looted in a thoroughly organized act by the local non-Jewish population of Sobrance soon after the deportation.

Sights 
To the north of the town is Sobranecké kúpele, once a popular spa before the First World War. Today it is totally abandoned.

A Guitar museum is located in the town.  The collection includes more than 200 guitars mainly from the period of 1947–1980. Perhaps the most valuable guitar is a Resonet Grazioso/Futurama from early in the career of George Harrison.

An Eastern Catholic Church of the Holy Seven Slavonic Saints (Sedmočislenici) was built in the town. It is a modern church building based on traditional Byzantine architecture models.

Demographics
According to the 2001 census, the town had 6,262 inhabitants. 95.37% of inhabitants were Slovaks, 0.91% Roma, 0.51% Czechs and 0.37% Ukrainian. The religious makeup was 51.09% Roman Catholics, 33.93% Greek Catholics, 3.59% people with no religious affiliation and 3.37% Orthodox.

Twin towns – sister cities

Sobrance is twinned with:
 Cigánd, Hungary
 Lubaczów, Poland
 Perechyn, Ukraine

Notable people
 

Julij Feldesi (1875–1947), Rusyn printer and politician

See also
 List of municipalities and towns in Slovakia

References

External links
 
 Official website

Cities and towns in Slovakia
Villages and municipalities in Sobrance District